Simone Cadamuro (born 28 June 1976) is an Italian former professional road racing cyclist.

He is a native of San Donà di Piave.

Major results 

1998
 1st Stage 4a Giro del Friuli Venezia Giulia
1999
 3rd La Popolarissima
2000
 1st GP Industrie del Marmo
 3rd Coppa San Geo
2001
 1st 
2002
 1st Stage 3 Okolo Slovenska
 2nd Stausee-Rundfahrt Klingnau
 4th Poreč Trophy
2003
 1st Stages 1 & 3 Tour de Pologne
2004
 1st Doha International GP
 1st Veenendaal–Veenendaal
 1st Stage 3 Tour of Qinghai Lake
 3rd Scheldeprijs
 3rd Ronde van Drenthe
2005
 1st Stage 2 Eneco Tour
 3rd Scheldeprijs
 7th Doha International GP
 8th Gent–Wevelgem
2006
 1st  Points classification, Eneco Tour
 2nd Ronde van Midden-Zeeland
 7th Omloop van de Vlaamse Scheldeboorden
2007
 1st Stage 2 Flèche du Sud
2008
 1st Stages 6 & 7 Tour de Serbie
 4th Poreč Trophy
 8th Giro di Toscana
 10th GP Costa Degli Etruschi
2009
 9th Dutch Food Valley Classic

External links

1976 births
Living people
People from San Donà di Piave
Italian male cyclists
Cyclists from the Metropolitan City of Venice